Chondrus crispus—commonly called Irish moss or carrageen moss (Irish carraigín, "little rock")—is a species of red algae  which grows abundantly along the rocky parts of the Atlantic coast of Europe and North America. In its fresh condition this protist is soft and cartilaginous, varying in color from a greenish-yellow, through red, to a dark purple or purplish-brown. The principal constituent is a mucilaginous body, made of the polysaccharide carrageenan, which constitutes 55% of its dry weight. The organism also consists of nearly 10% dry weight protein and about 15% dry weight mineral matter, and is rich in iodine and sulfur. When softened in water it has a sea-like odour and because of the abundant cell wall polysaccharides it will form a jelly when boiled, containing from 20 to 100 times its weight of water.

Description 
Chondrus crispus is a relatively small sea alga, reaching up to a little more than 20 cm in length. It grows from a discoid holdfast and branches four or five times in a dichotomous, fan-like manner. The morphology is highly variable, especially the broadness of the thalli. The branches are 2–15 mm broad and firm in texture, and the color ranges from bright green towards the surface of the water, to deep red at greater depths. The gametophytes (see below) often show a blue iridescence at the tip of the fronds and fertile sporophytes show a spotty pattern. Mastocarpus stellatus (Stackhouse) Guiry is a similar species which can be readily distinguished by its strongly channelled and often somewhat twisted thalli.

Distribution 
Chondrus crispus is common all around the shores of Ireland and can also be found along the coast of Europe including Iceland, the Faroe Islands. western Baltic Sea to southern Spain. It is found on the Atlantic coasts of Canada and recorded from California in the United States to Japan. However, any distribution outside the Northern Atlantic needs to be verified.
There are also other species of the same genus in the Pacific Ocean, for example, C. ocellatus Holmes, C. nipponicus Yendo, C. yendoi Yamada et Mikami, C. pinnulatus (Harvey) Okamura and C. armatus (Harvey) Yamada et Mikami.

Ecology
Chondrus crispus is found growing on rock from the middle intertidal zone into the subtidal zone, all the way to the ocean floor.  It is able to survive with minimal sunlight.

C. crispus is susceptible to infection from the oomycete Pythium porphyrae.

Uses

C. crispus is an industrial source of carrageenan commonly used as a thickener and stabilizer in milk products, such as ice cream and processed foods. In Europe, it is indicated as E407 or E407a. It may also be used as a thickener in calico printing and paper marbling, and for fining beer. Irish moss is frequently used with Mastocarpus stellatus (Gigartina mamillosa), Chondracanthus acicularis  (G. acicularis), and other seaweeds, which are all commonly found growing together. Carrageenan may be extracted from tropical seaweeds of the genera Kappaphycus and Eucheuma.

Life history
Irish moss undergoes an alternation of generation lifecycle common in many species of algae (see figure below). The two distinct stages are the sexual haploid gametophyte stage and the asexual diploid sporophyte stage. In addition, a third stage - the carposporophyte - is formed on the female gametophyte after fertilization.  The male and female gametophytes produce gametes which fuse to form a diploid carposporophyte, which forms carpospores, which develops into the sporophyte. The sporophyte then undergoes meiosis to produce haploid tetraspores (which can be male or female) that develop into gametophytes. The three stages (male, female, and sporophyte) are difficult to distinguish when they are not fertile; however, the gametophytes often show a blue iridescence.

Scientific interest

C. crispus, compared to most other seaweeds, is well-investigated scientifically. It has been used as a model species to study photosynthesis, carrageenan biosynthesis, and stress responses. The nuclear genome was sequenced in 2013. The genome size is 105 Mbp and is coding for 9,606 genes. It is characterised by relatively few genes with very few introns. The genes are clustered together, with normally short distances between genes and then large distances between groups of genes.

See also
 Gelidium amansii

References

External links 

 AlgaeBase: Chondrus crispus
 Chondrus crispus Stackhouse Chondrus crispus.
 Marine Life Information Network
 Irish Moss industry on Prince Edward Island 
 Sea Moss Market Report

Edible algae
Gigartinaceae
Flora of Jamaica
Demulcents
Taxa named by John Stackhouse
Flora without expected TNC conservation status